Krhov may refer to:

 Krhov (Blansko District)
 Krhov (Třebíč District)